Natalie Grandin (born 27 February 1981) is a retired tennis player from South Africa. She achieved a career-high singles ranking of 144 as of 12 September 2005. On 14 May 2012, she peaked at No. 22 in the doubles rankings. In her career, she won one WTA doubles title as well as three singles and 25 ITF doubles titles. She was known for her variety of play and volleying ability. Grandin retired from professional tennis in January 2015.

Biography
She was coached by Petra de Jong. Her father, Roy, is a project manager in IT while her mother, Rosamund, is a freight forwarder. Natalie has two sisters. She is a baseliner whose favorite shot is the forehand and her favorite surface is hard court. Grandin started playing tennis at age four. She speaks English and Afrikaans.

Significant finals

Premier Mandatory/Premier 5 finals

Doubles: 1 (runner-up)

WTA career finals

Doubles: 12 (1 title, 11 runner-ups)

ITF Circuit finals

Singles: 7 (3–4)

Doubles: 46 (25–21)

Grand Slam doubles performance timeline

External links

 
 
 

South African female tennis players
1981 births
Living people
Sportspeople from East London, Eastern Cape
White South African people